Shashikant Jayawantrao Shinde (born 19 Oct 1963) is an Indian politician who served as the Minister Of Water Resources for Krishna Valley Irrigation Corporation of Maharashtra. 
He is a politician from Koregaon in Satara district in the Maharashtra state of India. He was elected as a member of the Maharashtra Legislative Assembly from Koregaon for 2009-2014 as NCP candidate.

He contested and was elected for the assembly constituency in 2014 as NCP candidate.

References

Nationalist Congress Party politicians from Maharashtra
Living people
1963 births
People from Satara district
Maharashtra MLAs 2014–2019
Maharashtra MLAs 2009–2014
Maharashtra MLAs 2004–2009
Maharashtra MLAs 1999–2004
Marathi politicians